This list shows TV and film content that includes at least one critique of the Chinese Communist Party's actions. The list helps to understand where censorship of content outside of China by its ruling party has taken place, and where it hasn't.

Films by major studios 
These films by major studios tend to receive far greater financing, advertising and reach than independent films

Independent films 
Independent films are done outside of a major studio and often include documentaries

See also 
Beijing Independent Film Festival

Chinese censorship abroad

Cinema of Hong Kong

Cinema of South Korea

Cinema of Taiwan

Cinema of the United States

Film industry

Nazism and cinema: Censorship abroad

Self-censorship

References

Chinese Communist Party
Television censorship
Film censorship